Lambda Sigma is an American college honor society for second-year students. Originally named the Society of Cwens, the society was established at the University of Pittsburgh in Fall 1922 as a women's honors society, and became a national organization with the 1925 foundation of chapters at Miami University and the University of Missouri. The society is "dedicated to the purpose of fostering leadership, scholarship, fellowship, and the spirit of service among college students, and to promoting the interests of the college or university in every possible way".

History

Society of Cwens
In the early 1920s, University of Pittsburgh Dean Thyrsa Amos saw the need for a society for outstanding sophomore women. On 7 November 1922, twelve sophomore women responded to invitations and met at Heinz House, electing to found a society to sponsor activities for all freshmen and sophomore women and to "select for membership in the spring those freshman women who displayed the finest Pitt spirit, showed good scholarship and expressed interest in activities through fine participation in them". The society was named Cwens, from the word cwēn, meaning "lady" or "queen" in Anglo-Saxon. The emblem selected was a golden crown resting upon a sceptre.

Soon afterwards, Beta and Gamma chapters were founded at Miami University and the University of Missouri, with the first Society of Cwens conference held in May 1925 on the Miami campus. A charter was obtained to certify Cwens as a national organization; a petition was submitted, and on 16 June 1926, the certificate of incorporation was approved and the charter of the National Society of Cwens was recorded in the Common Pleas Court of Allegheny County. Titles of officers in the organization were given Anglo-Saxon names, and a national convention (called the Witan) was held twice annually, rotating among the colleges and universities having Cwen chapters. The society's publication was called The Tid.

The 1972 Witan, held in Pittsburgh on the campus of Duquesne University, observed the Fiftieth Anniversary of the society and climaxed in a "feast" in the Cathedral of Learning at the University of Pittsburgh. This ceremony, detailed in the book of rituals (the Hydan-Bok), is a revered event in the history of the organization.

Foundation of Lambda Sigma
However, in 1975, the Title IX Education Amendments mandated the abolishment of single-sex organizations in institutions of higher learning. In October 1975, Cwens chapter presidents gave authority to the National Executive Board to disband the society and to formulate plans for a national sophomore honor society for both men and women. The National Board disbanded the National Society of Cwens, founding the Lambda Sigma Society as a direct descendant on 6 March 1976. The Society of Cwens's goal of fostering leadership, scholarship, fellowship, and service remain the same in the child organization.

Insignia
Lambda Sigma's official symbol is composed of the Greek letters Lambda and Sigma in gold imposed on a blue lozenge. The letters are emblematic of the society's ideals of leadership and scholarship.

Membership
Membership in any chapter may not exceed 50 students, or 10 percent of the freshman class - whichever is lower. Students who achieve GPAs within at least the top 35 percent of the class at the time of selection are eligible for selection in the spring term following their completion of at least one academic term. These new members selected to Lambda Sigma become active during their second year.

Chapters
Lambda Sigma has 39 active chapters. Active chapters noted in bold, inactive chapters noted in italics:

References

External links
 Official website
 From CMU's The Tartan: "Sophomore honor society serves community"
  ACHS Lambda Sigma entry
  Lambda Sigma chapter list at ACHS

Student societies in the United States
Honor societies
Association of College Honor Societies
Student organizations established in 1922
1922 establishments in Pennsylvania